Giovanni Ferrari (6 December 1907 – 2 December 1982) was an Italian footballer who played as an attacking midfielder/inside forward on the left. He is regarded as one of the best players of his generation, one of Italy's best ever players, and as one of the greatest players of all time, having won the Serie A 8 times, as well as two consecutive FIFA World Cup titles (in 1934 and 1938) with the Italy national football team. Along with Giuseppe Meazza and Eraldo Monzeglio, he is one of only three Italian players to have won two World Cups.

A creative, advanced midfield playmaker, Ferrari was a strong, physically fit, hardworking, versatile, and well-rounded footballer, as well as being a generous team player. Due to his technical ability, vision, tactical intelligence, and passing ability, he excelled at building attacking plays and creating chances for teammates, at a time where assists weren´t recorded, but he was famous for setting up his teammates, although he was also capable of scoring himself due to his powerful and accurate shot. He was primarily deployed as an attacking midfielder/left–sided inside forward, known as the Mezzala role, in Italian football jargon. throughout his career.

Club career
Ferrari began his footballing career with local club Alessandria in the prima divisione nazionale in 1923, and he was also there when the newly established Serie A started in the season 1929-30, aside from a brief loan to Napoli during the 1925–26 season, where he scored an impressive 16 goals in 15 matches. He was given credit over the seven-year period (1923–1930) with Alessandria and Napoli in total to be playing 137 matches and scoring 78 goals. The following year Ferrari changed over to Juventus and was handed the number 10 shirt. Over that five-year period (1930–1935), which was his 1st spell at Juventus, he played in 160 games and scored 66 goals, in addition to providing many assists. Although the official number of assists he provided was not recorded, it was said to be extremely high. The next move Ferrari would make would be to Inter, where he also played for a five-yer period (1935-1940), and subsequently to Bologna for the 1940–41 season, before returning to Juventus in the 1941–42 season for his 2nd spell, this time as a player-manager in what turned out to be the final season of his playing career, winning his 10th major national trophy. After the Second World War, when Italian club football started up again in the season 1945-46, he became a full-time manager for Brescia.

1930-1935: Il Quinquennio d'Oro della Juventus 

Juventus had won 2 Italian Championships earlier in history, before it was named Serie A, but under his guidance, the club won 5 Serie A Titles in a row, Il Quinquennio d'Oro, by then a record of 1st 5 successive titles ever in Italy, which meant he in reality dragged Juventus into an era, as one of Italy’s biggest and most important clubs.

1935-1941: Making it a record 8 Serie A titles

He then went on to win 2 more Serie A titles & 1 Coppa Italia with Internazionale and 1 Serie A title with Bologna; Making him the first player to win a then record of 8 Serie A Championships, Virginio Rosetta also won 8 national championships, but 3 of them came before the formation of a professional Serie A. Ferrari is also one of six footballers to have won the Serie A title with 3 clubs, a feat he managed with Juventus, Inter, and Bologna; the other 5 players to have managed the same feat are Filippo Cavalli, Aldo Serena, Pietro Fanna, Sergio Gori, and Attilio Lombardo.
The record for most Serie A titles wasn´t broken for 77 years, until the season 2017-18 where Gianluigi Buffon won his 9th Serie A title, subsequently making it 10 Serie A titles in the season 2019-20, all 10 titles won with Juventus.

1941-1942: 2nd spell at Juventus & 10th major national trophy

He came back to Juventus where he won his 2nd Coppa Italia, which was his 10th major national trophy in what ended up in being his last season as a player.
After this season the Serie A & Coppa Italia was discontinued due to the Second World War.

International career
Ferraris 1st taste of success with the Italy national team was as part of the silver medal winning 1931-32 Central European International Cup squad. He then went on to win two consecutive World Cups (in 1934 & 1938), as well as the 1933-35 Central European International Cup. All 4 tournaments alongside teammates Giuseppe Meazza and Eraldo Monzeglio. The 3 (in terms of silverware) most successful players ever for Italy. In total he managed 44 appearances and 14 goals with the national side between 1930 and 1938. He later was the head coach of Italy from 1960 to 1961, and was part of the technical commission being co-manager with Paolo Mazza leading Italy in the 1962 FIFA World Cup., where Italy lost 1 match to the hosting nation Chile in the infamous Battle of Santiago (1962 FIFA World Cup), having 2 men sent off, while Chile had none sent off despite amongst other thing, a left-hook punch by Chilean outside-left Leonel Sánchez to Italian right-back Mario David, & later Leonel Sánchez actually broke Humberto Maschio's nose with another left hook but the English referee English referee Ken Aston still did nothing. After this match Ken Aston was never allowed to referee a World Cup match again.

Central European International Cup 1931-32

Ferrari was from the start of the 1931-32 Central European International Cup a regular starter in his playmaker/attacking midfielder role & also scored a goal in the away match against Czechoslovakia. The campaign ended with Italy being Runners-up after the Austrian Wunderteam lead by Matthias Sindelar, which meant Ferrari earned  his 1st international medal (Silver) with Italy.

FIFA World Cup 1934

Ferarri aside from his playmaker/attacking midfielder role scored 2 goals, both of them at the knock out stage, in his 1st World Cup. The 1st goal was against USA in the round of 16 and the 2nd goal equalizing against Spain in the 1/4 finals, earning Italy a replay (back then there was no penalty shoot-out, so if a match was tied after extra time, there would be a rematch the day after), which they won and subsequently ending up winning the World Cup, beating the Austrian Wunderteam in the semi-finals & Czechoslovakia lead by Oldrich Nejedly in the final but had it not been for Ferraris equalizer in the 1/4 finals, that would have been the end for Italy at the 1934 World cup.

Central European International Cup 1933-35

Ferrari aside from his playmaker/attacking midfielder role scored 3 goals in this gold winning campaign; home against Czechoslovakia, home against Switzerland & home against Hungary, this time helping Italy beat the Austrian Wunderteam  for the gold.

FIFA World Cup 1938

Ferrari was again a regular starter in his 2nd World Cup, where he from his playmaking/attacking midfielder role help guide Italy to its 2nd consecutive World Cup title, beating Hungary lead by György Sárosi in the final. Making him one of only three Italians to win 2 FIFA World Cups.

Personal life
Ferrari was born in Alessandria on December 6 in 1907 & died in Milan in 1982, aged 74.

Honours

Club
Juventus
 Serie A: 1930–31, 1931–32, 1932–33, 1933–34, 1934–35
 Coppa Italia: 1941-42

Internazionale
 Serie A: 1937–38, 1939–40
 Coppa Italia: 1938-39

Bologna
 Serie A: 1940–41

International
Italy
 FIFA World Cup: 1934, 1938
 Central European International Cup: 1933–35
 Central European International Cup: Runner-up: 1931-32

Individual
 Italian Football Hall of Fame: 2011 (Posthumous)

References

External links 
Profile

1907 births
1934 FIFA World Cup players
1938 FIFA World Cup players
1962 FIFA World Cup managers
1982 deaths
Bologna F.C. 1909 players
Inter Milan managers
Inter Milan players
FIFA World Cup-winning players
Italian football managers
Italian footballers
Italy international footballers
Calcio Padova managers
Italy national football team managers
Juventus F.C. players
U.S. Alessandria Calcio 1912 players
People from Alessandria
Serie A managers
Serie A players
Neuchâtel Xamax FCS managers
Association football forwards
Association football midfielders
Expatriate football managers in Eswatini
Italian expatriate football managers
Footballers from Piedmont
Sportspeople from the Province of Alessandria

simple:Giovanni Ferrari